The 17th Annual Black Reel Awards ceremony, presented by the Foundation for the Augmentation of African-Americans in Film (FAAAF) and honoring the best films of 2016, took place on February 16, 2017, beginning at 8:00 p.m. EST (5:00p.m. PST). During the ceremony, FAAAF will present the Black Reel Awards in 28 categories.

Moonlight led all films with 13 nominations.

Schedule

Winners and nominees
Winners are highlighted in bold.

Film

Television

References

Black Reel Awards
2016 film awards
2016 in American cinema
2016 awards in the United States